Physoptila is a genus of moth in the family Gelechiidae.

Species
 Physoptila scenica Meyrick, 1914
 Physoptila pinguivora Meyrick, 1934
 Physoptila termiticola (Turner, 1926)

References

Physoptilinae